Gall isographic projection is a specific instance of equirectangular projection such that its standard parallels are north and south 45°. The projection is named after James Gall, who presented it in 1855.

See also
Gall–Peters projection
Gall stereographic projection

External links
 Gall Isographic Projection, from Mathworks

Map projections
Cylindrical projections